Graciana Abraciano de Chironi (1921 – February 4, 2017) was an Argentine  film actress.

Chironi was the grandmother of well-known Argentine director Pablo Trapero.

She worked in the cinema of Argentina.

Filmography
 Negocios (1995) (short)
 Mundo grúa (1999)  Crane World
 El Bonaerense (2002)
 Familia rodante (2004) a.k.a. Rolling Family

References

External links
 

1921 births
2017 deaths
Argentine film actresses
Place of birth missing